Elections to Limavady Borough Council were held on 20 May 1981 on the same day as the other Northern Irish local government elections. The election used three district electoral areas to elect a total of 15 councillors.

Election results

Note: "Votes" are the first preference votes.

Districts summary

|- class="unsortable" align="centre"
!rowspan=2 align="left"|Ward
! % 
!Cllrs
! % 
!Cllrs
! %
!Cllrs
! %
!Cllrs
! % 
!Cllrs
!rowspan=2|TotalCllrs
|- class="unsortable" align="center"
!colspan=2 bgcolor="" | UUP
!colspan=2 bgcolor="" | SDLP
!colspan=2 bgcolor="" | DUP
!colspan=2 bgcolor="" | IIP
!colspan=2 bgcolor="white"| Others
|-
|align="left"|Area A
|32.9
|2
|bgcolor="#99FF66"|50.3
|bgcolor="#99FF66"|3
|16.7
|1
|0.0
|0
|0.0
|0
|6
|-
|align="left"|Area B
|bgcolor="40BFF5"|33.7
|bgcolor="40BFF5"|2
|24.5
|1
|8.2
|0
|17.9
|1
|15.7
|1
|5
|-
|align="left"|Area C
|bgcolor="40BFF5"|44.2
|bgcolor="40BFF5"|2
|27.5
|1
|23.0
|1
|0.0
|0
|5.3
|0
|4
|-
|- class="unsortable" class="sortbottom" style="background:#C9C9C9"
|align="left"| Total
|37.2
|6
|34.2
|5
|16.4
|2
|5.5
|1
|6.7
|1
|15
|-
|}

Districts results

Area A

1977: 3 x SDLP, 2 x UUP, 1 x DUP
1981: 3 x SDLP, 2 x UUP, 1 x DUP
1977-1981 Change: No change

Area B

1977: 2 x UUP, 2 x SDLP, 1 x Independent
1981: 2 x UUP, 1 x SDLP, 1 x IIP, 1 x Independent
1977-1981 Change: IIP gain from SDLP

Area C

1977: 2 x UUP, 1 x SDLP, 1 x DUP
1981: 2 x UUP, 1 x SDLP, 1 x DUP
1977-1981 Change: No change

References

Limavady Borough Council elections
Limavady